Meiacanthus lineatus, the lined fangblenny, is a venomous species of combtooth blenny found in the Great Barrier Reef in the western Pacific Ocean.  This species grows to a length of  TL.

References

lineatus
Fish described in 1884